Francesca Battistelli (born May 18, 1985) is an American Christian singer and songwriter. She was originally an independent artist and had released an independent album, Just a Breath, in 2004. Her first studio album on Fervent Records, My Paper Heart, was released on July 22, 2008.
radio stations on July 15, 2008, and charted on national Christian CHR charts. The song was the 16th most played song of 2008 on Christian radio stations according to R&R magazine. Battistelli received her first Grammy Award nomination in 2009, for Best Gospel Performance with her single, "Free to Be Me". She later received her first Grammy Award in 2016 at the 58th Annual Grammy Awards for Best Contemporary Christian Music Performance/Song with her single "Holy Spirit" written by the worship band Jesus Culture from her album If We're Honest.

Biography

Early life 
Battistelli was born on May 18, 1985, in New York City. She is the only child of Mike and author, Kate Battistelli. She grew up in a musical family with both of her parents involved in musical theater. "There was just something about live theater—especially musical theater—that has always resonated with me", she said. She "knew that she was going to spend her life performing" after seeing a performance of the musical The Secret Garden on Broadway at the age of six. "So I thought that was it. I was going to be Mary Lennox in The Secret Garden."

When she was 15, she became a member of the Orlando, Florida all-girl mainstream pop group Bella. The group's touring performances included singing and dancing, which were "two things I loved", she said. After the group disbanded, Battistelli picked up the guitar and began writing songs.

Career 
As an independent artist, Battistelli released her debut album, Just a Breath, in 2004. In early 2008, she released the I'm Letting Go EP exclusively through iTunes on Fervent Records, which contains four songs, including the title track. All four songs were included on her first major label studio album, My Paper Heart, which was released on July 22, 2008. The album was produced by Dove Award-winning producer Ian Eskelin and published through Word Distribution. Her first radio single, "I'm Letting Go", was released on July 15, 2008. The song had reached the top 20 on R&R's Christian CHR charts by May 30, 2008. In early July 2008, the song reached No. 10 on Christian CHR charts.

The song "Free to Be Me", which received a Grammy nomination in 2009, was partially inspired when she backed her car into a lawyer's car, resulting in the line "'cause I got a couple dents in my fender".

Battistelli began a period of touring in the U.S. in early 2008; she played solo concerts as well as performing with fellow Fervent Records band Big Daddy Weave. She performed at several Christian music festivals throughout mid-2008, such as Spirit West Coast in California and Alive Fest. In late 2008, she guested on a tour with Aaron Shust and NewSong.

Her debut single, "I'm Letting Go", reached No. 3 on R&R's Christian CHR and AC charts during mid to late 2008. Her next single, "Free to Be Me", reached No. 1 on the R&R Christian CHR format in March 2009 and held the top position for nine consecutive weeks through the beginning of May.

Battistelli joined TobyMac, Hawk Nelson, Brandon Heath and others on the Winter Jam 2009 tour, the nation's largest annual Christian music tour, which ran from January through March 2009. On November 23, 2009, Battistelli's song "It's Your Life" was featured on the series finale of Jon & Kate Plus 8 and The Biggest Loser, the same day It's Your Life, featuring all of the singles, was released on iTunes US. It's Your Life Dented Fender Session was also released at that time. "It's Your Life" was also used in the film Soul Surfer.

Battistelli toured on Winter Jam again for 2011 and released a second studio album, Hundred More Years, on March 1, 2011. The album was preceded by the release of a single, "This is the Stuff", in early 2011, which was followed in July by "Motion of Mercy". On October 16, 2012, Battistelli released Christmas, a collection of traditional holiday music.

On April 22, 2014, Battistelli's third studio album was released and titled If We're Honest.

Battistelli released "Future" exclusively to Pizza Ranch on June 1, 2015. The song was written by Battistelli and Casey Brown and was produced by Ian Eskelin.
In late 2016, Battistelli toured with Bethel Music and was featured on two songs on their 2017 release, Starlight. In late 2017, she released Greatest Hits: The First Ten Years.

On June 15, 2018, Battistelli released "The Breakup Song", the first single from her fourth studio album, Own It. The second single, "This Could Change Everything", was released on October 12, 2018.

Acting career
In 2021, Battistelli starred in the American Christian drama film, God's Not Dead: We the People.

Style 
Battistelli's music is influenced by several genres. One reviewer wrote that "Battistelli's soulful piano-pop sound resembles a blend of her music interests—jazz, rock, gospel and R&B." Battistelli stated that when she began writing music, "I really longed to bring something authentic to the [Christian music] scene that even non-Christians could listen to."

Personal life 
Battistelli is married to, and managed by, Matt Goodwin, whom she met on the Winter Jam tour when he was playing drums in the band NewSong. They wed on August 22, 2009 and live in Nashville, Tennessee with their six children.

Discography 

Just a Breath (2004)
 My Paper Heart (2008)
 Hundred More Years (2011)
 Christmas (2012)
 If We're Honest (2014)
 Own It (2018)
 This Christmas (2020)

Awards

Grammy Awards

GMA Dove Awards

Filmography

References

External links 

 

1985 births
Living people
American performers of Christian music
American women pianists
Christian music songwriters
Fervent Records artists
Grammy Award winners
Performers of contemporary Christian music
Singers from New York City
Songwriters from New York (state)
University of Central Florida alumni
Word Records artists
21st-century American women singers
21st-century American pianists